Myriotrema grandisporum is a species of corticolous (bark-dwelling) lichen in the family Graphidaceae. Found in Eastern Thailand, it was formally described as a new species in 2002 by lichenologists Natsurang Homchantara and Brian J. Coppins. It is only known to occur at the type locality.

The lichen has a shiny, finely warted (verruculose) thallus with a poorly developed cortex and a white medulla. Its ascospores are thin-walled, somewhat translucent to brown, and spindle-shaped (fusiform), typically measuring 204.5–252.5 long by 17.5–25.5 μm wide. They have a transverse septum and contains from 45 to 49 locules (internal spaces). The lichen contains norstictic acid, a secondary compound that is rare in the genus Myriotrema.

References

grandisporum
Lichen species
Lichens described in 2002
Lichens of Thailand
Taxa named by Brian John Coppins
Taxa named by Natsurang Homchantara